Nemapogon leechi is a moth of the family Tineidae. It is found in India.

References

Moths described in 1980
Nemapogoninae